Joel Sherman Wright (1869 – September 20, 1909) was a professional baseball player. He played parts of two seasons in Major League Baseball for the Louisville Colonels and Pittsburgh Pirates in 1895–96, primarily as an outfielder.

Wright started his professional baseball career in 1890 with the Ottawa team in the Illinois–Iowa League. He broke into the majors in 1895 with the Colonels, where he played the second-most games in the outfield on the team. The next season, he was traded to the Pirates in May.

Wright returned to play in the minor leagues from 1897 to 1900. He died in 1909.

External links

Major League Baseball outfielders
Louisville Colonels players
Pittsburgh Pirates players
Ottawa (minor league baseball) players
Appleton Papermakers players
Oshkosh Indians players
Easton Dutchmen players
Harrisburg Senators players
Memphis Lambs players
Memphis Giants players
Toronto Canadians players
Albany Senators players
Milwaukee Brewers (minor league) players
Rock Island (minor league baseball) players
Youngstown Little Giants players
Rock Island-Moline Islanders players
Omaha Omahogs players
Marion Glass Blowers players
Baseball players from Wisconsin
19th-century baseball players
Sportspeople from Omaha, Nebraska
Sportspeople from Oshkosh, Wisconsin
1869 births
1909 deaths
Burials in Wisconsin